Central Park is a 1932 United States pre-Code feature-length crime drama film directed by John G. Adolfi. This rarely seen film stars Wallace Ford and Joan Blondell and exists in a nitrate print at the Library of Congress. It has seen a DVD release by Teakwood Video.

Plot
Two destitute New Yorkers meet in Central Park to then get separated after getting involved with some gangsters. The gangsters pose as police officers to make money. The two New Yorkers are reunited in the end

Cast
 Joan Blondell as Dot
 Wallace Ford as Rick
 Guy Kibbee as Policeman Charlie Cabot
 Henry B. Walthall as Eby
 John Wray as Robert Smiley
 Harold Huber as Nick Sarno
 Lee Shumway as Al	(uncredited)
 Larry Steers as Headwaiter (uncredited)

References

External links
 
 
 
 

1932 films
1932 crime drama films
American black-and-white films
American crime drama films
Films directed by John G. Adolfi
Films set in New York City
First National Pictures films
Warner Bros. films
1930s English-language films
Central Park
1930s American films